Lasiochlora is a genus of moths in the family Geometridae described by Warren in 1894.

Species
Lasiochlora bicolor (Thierry-Mieg, 1907)
Lasiochlora diducta (Walker, 1861)

References

Geometrinae